Con Games is a 2001 American direct to video action drama film written and directed by Jefferson Edward Donald, starring Tommy Lee Thomas, Eric Roberts, Martin Kove, Amy Fadhli, and the late Matthew Ansara.

Plot
A senator's grandson is murdered while incarcerated at California's notorious "Doscher State Prison", nicknamed "Dachau" by convicts for the number of unsolved murders of inmates that have taken place therein.  Hired by the senator, Gulf War veteran John Woodrow (Tommy Lee Thomas) infiltrates the prison to find the murderer, and learns that the grandson was killed by corrupt head guard Lt. Hopkins (Eric Roberts).  When Hopkins discovers Woodrow's true identity, he has him tortured by inmates and guards. After an arduous shooting chase through the desert, Woodrow escapes.

Cast
 Eric Roberts as Officer Hopkins
 Tommy Lee Thomas as John Woodrow
 Matthew Ansara as Saul
 Amy Fadhli as Ashley Stephenson
 Moe Irvin as Eddie Long
 Martin Kove as Redick
 Katherine Parks as Admin Assistant
 Michael Durack as Frank Nelson
 Dave Casper as Detective
 Sheila Campbell as Jeanette
 Patricia Bosse as Melanie Richards
 Tiffany Brouwer as Britney Woodrow
 Marc Chenail as Robinson
 Bill Fishback as Goetz
 Tony Harras as Warden Alvarez
 John Adam Kraemer as Sid
 Ross Nolan as McCain

Background
Principal filming began in May 2001.  To prepare himself for the film, actor and co-screenwriter Tommy Lee Thomas trained for seven months prior to shooting in order to get in shape, and his sessions included training by Lou Ferrigno.  Thomas acknowledges having studied "muscle magazines" and appearances in them, as well as competing in bodybuilding competitions.  Thomas realized the advantage of getting a recognizable name for his film and was able to secure Erik Roberts. While Roberts did not have the "star power" he held in his earlier career, he still had enough so that Thomas was able to facilitate the film's release in the U.S. and overseas.  Keaton Simonds was to sing the song for the film's end credits, but Eric Roberts sang the song instead after Simonds changed his mind.

Reception
Film Threat praised both the film and its star, writing that the film was "a very entertaining B-level action film that was released in 2002 to barely any acknowledgement."   They made note of the film's low production values and budget, and that the scenes depicting the prison itself reflected this in the small number of inmates and even fewer number of prison guards.  They noted Tommy Lee Thomas as having co-written the screenplay, and wrote that he was "the fuel to this vehicle", that "clearly he studied a lot of Clint Eastwood films and he mastered the legendary star’s steely-eyed squint and sparse line deliveries," and that he "clearly possesses a sense of eccentric humor."  They concluded "As low-budget action flicks go, this one is very diverting and highly watchable."

Rovi panned the film, making note that the "men in prison" B-movie genre is represented by the film as its "too-literal acting is right out of 1960s drive-in cinema".  Referring to the film as a "train wreck of a feature", they noted it as an attempt by Tommy Lee Thomas to establish credentials as an actor.  They noted the script being poorly developed by writing it is "unimaginably filled with hilarious lines", and the cinematography as poor when writing "the camera seems not to know where it wants to be in most scenes".  Rovi also addresses the acting of Eric Roberts, writing that he "devours the scenery as if it were steak."  They summarize by writing "The movie is a bomb. But, there's an endearing earnestness that overcomes the shoddy amateurism."  They concluded that "Only the most undemanding of action fans are going to appreciate this one".

Release
The film had subsequent DVD releases. A re-release was made by Third Millennium on May 27, 2002, and a version with Spanish subtitles was released by MTI Home Video on July 23, 2002.

References

External links
 Con Games at the Internet Movie Database
 

2001 films
American action drama films
American prison drama films
2000s prison drama films
Films set in California
Films shot in California
American independent films
2001 action drama films
2001 independent films
2000s English-language films
2000s American films